Sam Dwyer (born 29 August 1986) is a professional Australian rules footballer who plays for Port Melbourne. He played for the Collingwood Football Club in the Australian Football League (AFL). He was recruited by the club with draft pick #27 in the 2013 Rookie Draft after performing well for Port Melbourne in the Victorian Football League (VFL). He made his debut in Round 1, 2013, against  at Docklands Stadium.

Dwyer was lauded for his performance in his second AFL game against Carlton, collecting 23 disposals and kicking one goal.

In his eighth AFL appearance, Dwyer amassed 27 disposals and three goals in a 6-point upset win against the previously undefeated Geelong. Dwyer played only 5 games in 2015 and was delisted after 39 games and 22 goals

Following his delistment from Collingwood, Dwyer returned to Port Melbourne.

Statistics

|- style="background-color: #EAEAEA"
! scope="row" style="text-align:center" | 2013
|  || 41 || 21 || 15 || 9 || 174 || 174 || 348 || 82 || 36 || 0.7 || 0.4 || 8.3 || 8.3 || 16.6 || 3.9 || 1.7
|- 
! scope="row" style="text-align:center" | 2014
|  || 2 || 13 || 3 || 4 || 105 || 109 || 214 || 54 || 16 || 0.2 || 0.3 || 8.1 || 8.4 || 16.5 || 4.2 || 1.2
|-  style="background-color: #EAEAEA"
! scope="row" style="text-align:center" | 2015
|  || 2 || 5 || 4 || 2 || 30 || 24 || 54 || 14 || 7 || 0.8 || 0.4 || 6.0 || 4.8 || 10.8 || 2.8 || 1.4
|- class="sortbottom"
! colspan=3| Career
! 39
! 22
! 15
! 309
! 307
! 616
! 150
! 59
! 0.56
! 0.38
! 7.92
! 7.87
! 15.79
! 3.85
! 1.51
|}

References

External links

1986 births
Living people
Collingwood Football Club players
Australian rules footballers from Victoria (Australia)
Port Melbourne Football Club players